Jared George Hodgkiss (born 15 November 1986) is an English professional footballer who plays as a right-back for Hereford.

Career

West Bromwich Albion
Hodgkiss was born in Stafford, Staffordshire. He made his first team debut in the FA Cup third round match against Reading on 17 January 2006 at the Madejski Stadium. His Premier League debut came on 7 May 2006, coming on for Steve Watson on the last match day of the season, at Goodison Park against Everton. In August 2007 Hodgkiss signed a new two-year deal at Albion. His full league debut was in a 2–1 win away at Leicester City on 8 December 2007.

In August 2008, he joined Aberdeen on a loan deal until January 2009 and made eight appearances for the Scottish side. A second loan spell followed in March, this time at Northampton Town for the remainder of the season. Hodgkiss played five games for the League One club.

Hodgkiss was released by West Brom in the summer of 2009. After his release, Hodgkiss  maintained his match fitness by playing for Market Drayton Town in the Northern Premier League Division One South.

Forest Green Rovers
In October 2009, Hodgkiss signed for Conference Premier side Forest Green Rovers. He made his debut on 3 October 2009 in a 1–0 away defeat against Mansfield Town. He scored his first goal for the club in a FA Cup first round proper 1–1 draw with Mansfield Town a month later. His first league goal for Forest Green came in a 1–1 home draw with Cambridge United on 20 February 2010.

After an impressive spell with Forest Green, he was awarded a new one-year contract for the 2010–11 season. He picked up a knee injury in February 2011 and was forced to have an operation as well as six weeks out on the sidelines. In June 2011, Hodgkiss signed a new one-year contract with Forest Green. In July 2011 it was announced that he would be the new first team captain at Forest Green for the 2011–12 season. On 6 March 2012, he agreed a new extended contract with Forest Green that would keep him at the club until the end of the 2013–14 season. He made his 100th league appearance for Forest Green on the final day of the 2011–12 season against York City.

On 28 April 2014, having made 164 league appearances for Forest Green, he was released after a five-season stay with the club.

Kidderminster Harriers
On 23 June 2014, Hodgkiss joined Kidderminster Harriers on a one-year contract. He made his debut for the club on the opening day of the 2014–15 Conference Premier season where he played the full 90 minutes in a 0–0 away draw with Lincoln City. He left the club in the summer 2017.

Hereford

On 26 July 2019, Hodgkiss joined National League North club Hereford after a successful trial period.

In May 2021, Hodgkiss captained Hereford as they appeared in the  2021 FA Trophy Final. 

In May 2022, Hodgkiss signed a one-year contract extension at Hereford, extending his stay for the 2022-2023 season.

Career statistics

References

External links
 
 

1986 births
Living people
Sportspeople from Stafford
English footballers
Association football defenders
West Bromwich Albion F.C. players
Aberdeen F.C. players
Northampton Town F.C. players
Market Drayton Town F.C. players
Forest Green Rovers F.C. players
Kidderminster Harriers F.C. players
Premier League players
English Football League players
Scottish Premier League players
Northern Premier League players
National League (English football) players
Macclesfield Town F.C. players